Hertfordshire is a county in eastern England. It is bordered by Bedfordshire to the north, Cambridgeshire to the north-east, Essex to the east, Buckinghamshire to the west and Greater London to the south. The county town is Hertford.

As of July 2019, there are 43 sites designated within this Area of Search, 36 of which have been designated for their biological interest and 7 for their geological interest. In England the body responsible for designating SSSIs is Natural England, which chooses a site "because of its flora, fauna, or geological or physiographical features".

Key

Interest
B = a site of biological interest
G = a site of geological interest

Other classifications
CAONB = Chilterns Area of Outstanding Natural Beauty
GCR = Geological Conservation Review
EWT = Essex Wildlife Trust
HMWT = Herts and Middlesex Wildlife Trust
LNR = Local nature reserve
NCR = A Nature Conservation Review
NNR = National nature reserve
NT = National Trust
Ramsar = Ramsar site
RHPG = Register of Historic Parks and Gardens of Special Historic Interest in England
RSPB = Royal Society for the Protection of Birds
SM = Scheduled monument
SPA = Special Protection Area
WT = Woodland Trust

Sites

See also
Herts and Middlesex Wildlife Trust
List of Local Nature Reserves in Hertfordshire

Notes

References

 
Hertfordshire
Sites of Special
Geology of Hertfordshire